The Cinders is a lava field including a volcanic hill named Ice Springs craters in the west-central portion of Utah, United States.  It is also known as the Ice Springs Volcanic Field.

Geology
The Cinders are part of the Black Rock Desert volcanic field.  The lava of The Cinders is basalt of late Holocene age.  The basalt erupted from the vent at the Ice Springs craters less than 700 years ago (as of 2020).  It is the youngest basalt flow in Utah.

To the south is a somewhat older lava flow surrounding Tabernacle Hill.

The basalt of the Cinders and Tabernacle hill was first mapped by geologists Grove Karl Gilbert and Israel Russell in 1890 (see map below).

References

Volcanoes of Utah
Buttes of the United States
Volcanic fields of the Great Basin section
Landforms of Millard County, Utah
Volcanic fields of Utah